DCX may refer to:

Science and technology
 McDonnell Douglas DC-X, an unmanned prototype spacecraft
 Digital customer experience
 DCX (gene), which encodes the protein doublecortin
 .dcx (DCX), a document image format, the Multipage PCX
 610 (number) (Roman numerals)

Other uses
 Dixie Chicks, an alternative-country band
 Delta Chi Xi, an honorary professional fraternity
 DCX (band), a Finnish electro dance music group
 Brocade Communications Systems Backbone network switch

See also
 DC10 (disambiguation)